Joco or JoCo is a nickname for Jonathan Coulton (born 1970), singer.

Joco may also refer to:

Jo Coburn (born 1968), journalist and TV presenter
Joco (duo), German musical duo
Joco McDonnell, a Shaman King character
Johnson County, Kansas, nicknamed JoCo